Bettiah railway station (code BTH), is a railway station in India in the Samastipur Division of East Central Railway. Bettiah railway station is located in Bettiah city, administrative headquarters of the West Champaran district in the state of Bihar. Bettiah station is well connected to Patna, Muzaffarpur, Hajipur, Delhi, Mumbai, Kolkata, Howrah, Kanpur, Guwahati, Surat, Lucknow, Amritsar, Ranchi, and other major cities. It is also the originating station for many express trains.

Connectivity 
There are total 49 trains available, Train Departures ECR/East Central Zone – Railway Enquiry.which connect to some major cities of India viz., Amritsar, Bihar (Darbhanga, Katihar, Muzaffarpur, Narkatiaganj, Patliputra, Raxaul & Saharsa), Dehradun, Delhi (Anand Vihar),  Guwahati, Gujarat (Ahmedabad & Porbandar), Howrah (Kolkata), Jaipur, Jammu, Mumbai (Bandra & LTT) and Uttar Pradesh (Bareilly, Kanpur, Lucknow & Manduadih).

Trains 
Samastipur is the divisional headquarters; several local passenger trains and express trains run from Bettiah to neighbouring destinations.
List of some important trains that stop at Bettiah:Departures from BTH/Bettiah

*Pending

 Pair of passenger train run from Gorakhpur to Bettiah
 Pair of MEMU passenger train run from Muzaffarpur to Bettiah
 Pair of trains run from Raxaul to Bettiah
Doubling MFP-NKE-PNY undergoing project.

Platforms
There are 3 platforms at Bettiah Railway Station. The platforms are interconnected with one foot overbridges (FOB). Platform 1 & 2 are the busiest platforms and are mostly used for long-haul trains.

References

Railway stations in West Champaran district